Qianshan is the atonal pinyin romanization of various Chinese placenames related to mountains or islands.

It may refer to:

 Qian Mountains (Qiānshān), a northeastern mountain range
 Qianshan District (Qiānshānqū) in Anshan, Liaoning
 Qianshan County (Qianshanxian), Anhui
 Qianshan (千山镇, Qianshanzhen), a town within Qianshan District, Anshan, Liaoning
 Qianshan (钤山镇, Qianshanzhen), a town in Fenyi County, Jiangxi
 Qianshan Subdistrict (Qiánshān Jiēdào), a subdistrict (formerly a separate town) of Xiangzhou District, Zhuhai, Guangdong
 Qianshan National Park (Qianshan Guojia Gongyuan) in Anshan, Liaoning